Jasmin Hurić (born 14 September 1972) is a former Bosnian-Herzegovinian international football player.

International career
He made his debut for Bosnia and Herzegovina in a June 2001 friendly match against Slovakia and has earned a total of 8 caps (2 unofficial), scoring no goals. His final international was an October 2002 European Championship qualification match against Norway.

References

External links
 
 

1972 births
Living people
Footballers from Sarajevo
Association football defenders
Bosnia and Herzegovina footballers
Bosnia and Herzegovina international footballers
FK Željezničar Sarajevo players
GNK Dinamo Zagreb players
NK Jedinstvo Bihać players
NK Primorje players
HŠK Posušje players
Premier League of Bosnia and Herzegovina players
Slovenian PrvaLiga players
Bosnia and Herzegovina expatriate footballers
Expatriate footballers in Croatia
Bosnia and Herzegovina expatriate sportspeople in Croatia
Expatriate footballers in Slovenia
Bosnia and Herzegovina expatriate sportspeople in Slovenia